Bu ol Kheyr (also Romanized as Bū ol Kheyr and Bū al Kheyr; also known as Bolkheir, Bolkheyr, Bol Kheyr, Bowlkhayr, Bū al Kheyz, and Bū‘l Khair) is a village in Bu ol Kheyr Rural District, Delvar District, Tangestan County, Bushehr Province, Iran. At the 2006 census, its population was 1,940, in 466 families.

References 

Populated places in Tangestan County